Jeffrey Michael Jacquet (born October 15, 1966) is a former American actor perhaps best known for his television roles as Eugene in the first season of the ABC sitcom Mork & Mindy and as Jeremy Saldino on the CBS science-fiction adventure series Whiz Kids.

Life and career
Jacquet started his career as a child actor in 1978 in the films Return from Witch Mountain and Bloodbrothers. Later that year, he was cast as Eugene in the first season of Mork & Mindy. Eugene was a 12-year-old kid who was a friend of Mork's, and took violin lessons from Cora, Mindy's grandmother. Jacquet was let go after the first season, when the producers decided to take the show in another direction. When he left the show, he went on to appear in a handful of other projects including Wholly Moses!, Whiz Kids as well as appearances in television shows such as The Jeffersons, Simon & Simon and Our House.

Since retiring from acting, Jacquet has been working as a lawyer in Los Angeles, California since 1993.

Filmography

References

External links

1966 births
Living people
American male child actors
American male television actors
American male film actors
African-American male actors
Male actors from Texas
People from Bay City, Texas
Lawyers from Los Angeles
University of California, Berkeley alumni
UCLA School of Law alumni
21st-century African-American people
20th-century African-American people